Prospectus may refer to:
 Prospectus (finance), also called a concept note
 Prospectus (university)
 Prospectus (book)
 Prospectus (album), a 1983 album by saxophonist Steve Lacy
 Parkland College's newspaper